Number24 is a Japanese anime television series produced by PRA and directed by Shigeru Kimiya. It was broadcast on Tokyo MX from January to April 2020.

Plot
Natsusa Yuzuki has been playing rugby as a left-winger ever since he was a child, and after enrolling in Doushisha University for college, he quickly becomes a rising star in the Kansai University League.

His dreams are shattered, however, when a nasty motorbike accident leaves him with a cervical herniated disk — making him unable to be able to play rugby ever again. Unwilling to let go of the sport completely and with no role available other than the position of the university team manager, he accepts his new post and hopes to help his squad obtain a league title.

Natsusa’s team is an unlikely bunch, including but not limited to his stoic best friend and full-back Seiichirou Shingyouji, whose reliability and consistency Natsusa depends on; hot-headed first-year Yasunari Tsuru, who harbors a strong dislike for Natsusa, filling his senior's old position as back left wing; and Yuu Mashiro, who is struggling to hold his ground as a scrum half.

In addition, a year ago, Ibuki Ueoka, the genius stand-off that was once Doushisha's ace, suddenly quit rugby — and now Natsusa is determined to get him back.

With the goal of strengthening the team he once belonged to as a player, Natsusa sets out to help Doushisha reach rugby nationals.

Characters

Doushisha University

Ethan Taylor

Koufuuin University

Production and release
The series was first announced by Movic in March 2019. The series was produced by PRA and directed by Shigeru Kimiya, with Rika Nakase writing the scripts and Saori Sakaguchi designing the characters. Takatoshi Hamano served as the series' sound director. The series premiered on Tokyo MX on January 8, 2020. Masanori Kobayashi performed the opening theme song, "Set". The series has three ending themes, "Kimi to Iru nara", "Comical Try!!", and "Every Fight". They were performed by Kengo Kawanishi and Ryōta Suzuki, Kawanishi and Junichi Yanagita, and Kawanishi and Shōhei Komatsu respectively. Episodes 11 and 12 were originally intended to be broadcast on March 18 and March 25, 2020. However, due to the COVID-19 pandemic, they were delayed to April 8 and April 15, 2020, respectively.

Internationally, the series was licensed by Funimation outside of Asia.

Reception
Caitlin Moore from Anime Feminist praised the plot and characters, while criticizing the animation and character designs. Rebecca Silverman from Anime News Network praised the series for the main trio's story and the theme music, while criticizing the large amounts of characters and plot points present in the series. She also felt there were some body issues in the art.

References

External links
  
 

2020 anime television series debuts
Anime postponed due to the COVID-19 pandemic
Anime with original screenplays
Crunchyroll anime
Rugby in anime and manga
Tokyo MX original programming